Albinus or Albin was the Prefect of Provence from 573 until he was replaced by Dynamius in 575. He was a royal appointee of Sigebert I. After his prefecture was up, he was elected to replace Ferreolus as Bishop of Uzès in 581.

The man he had replaced as prefect, Jovinus, later testified against him in court when it was alleged that he had unlawfully imprisoned an archdeacon on Christmas Day for the theft of a merchant's goods. After Albinus died the cathedral chapter elected Jovinus bishop.

Sources

Rulers of Provence
Bishops of Uzès
6th-century Frankish nobility
Year of birth unknown
Year of death unknown